Swedish Iranians or Swedish Persians consist of people of Iranian nationality who have settled in Sweden, as well as Swedish residents and citizens of Iranian heritage. As of 2019, there were 80,136 residents of Sweden born in Iran, as well as 40,883 born in Sweden with at least one Iranian-born parent.

Terminology 
Swedish-Iranian is used interchangeably with Swedish-Persian, partly due to the fact that, in the Western world, Iran was known as "Persia". On the Nowruz of 1935, Reza Shah Pahlavi asked foreign delegates to use the term Iran, the endonym of the country used since the Sasanian Empire, in formal correspondence. Since then the use of the word "Iran" has become more common in the Western countries. This also changed the usage of the terms for Iranian nationality, and the common adjective for citizens of Iran changed from "Persian" to "Iranian". In 1959, the government of Mohammad Reza Pahlavi, Reza Shah Pahlavi's son, announced that both "Persia" and "Iran" could officially be used interchangeably. However the issue is still debated today.

There is a tendency among Swedish Iranians to categorize themselves as "Persian" rather than "Iranian", mainly to dissociate themselves from the Islamic regime of Iran which has been in charge since the 1979 Revolution, and also to distinguish themselves as being of Persian ethnicity, which comprise about 65% of Iran's population. While the majority of Iranians come from Persian backgrounds, there is a significant number of non-Persian Iranians such as Azeris and Kurds within the Iranian community of Sweden, leading some scholars to believe that the label "Iranian" is more inclusive, since the label "Persian" excludes non-Persian minorities.  The Collins English Dictionary uses a variety of similar and overlapping definitions for the terms "Persian" and "Iranian".

Demographics 
There are approximately 63,828 people born in Iran living in Sweden today, as well as 28,600 people born in Sweden with at least one parent born in Iran. They are one of Sweden's largest immigrant groups, accounting for about 1.7% of the population.

The very first wave of Iranian refugees consisted of 5,000 Iranian refugees who fled to Sweden in 1979-1980 most of them were middle-aged, middle-class Pahlavi supporters who were opposing the revolution. When the Iran-Iraq War broke out in 1980, almost 20,000 Iranian citizens found asylum in Sweden. Second generation Iranian Swedes are well-represented in higher education and in some well paying professions like dentistry and engineering.
 
About 60% percent of Swedish Iranians go on to higher education – more than the Swedish average (45%). Iranian culture with its emphasis on education may be part of the reason for this. Becoming an engineer or a doctor is a mantra in many families. Abundantly represented minorities amongst the Swedish Iranians, like in other Iranian diaspora nations are Azerbaijanis, Kurds, Armenians and Assyrians.

Notable Iranians in Sweden

 Snoh Aalegra, singer and songwriter
 Mana Aghaee, poet and writer
 Minoo Akhtarzand, governor of Jönköping County
 Poya Asbaghi, football manager
 William Atashkadeh, professional footballer
 Hanif Bali, MP and part of the party executive of the Moderate Party
 Sean Banan, singer, comedian and entertainer
 Arash Bayat, footballer
 Hanni Beronius, beauty queen and Miss Universe Sweden 2012
 Cameron Cartio, singer
 Akira Corassani, UFC fighter
 Ashk Dahlén, scholar, linguist, translator
 Reza Khelili Dylami, politician
 Ali Esbati, politician
 Athena Farrokhzad, poet
 Rashid Farivar, politician
 Mohammad Fazlhashemi, professor in History of Ideas, Umeå University
 Azita Ghahreman, poet, translator, writer, member of the International PEN
 Saman Ghoddos, international footballer* Adam Hemati, footballer for Persepolis F.C.
 Jasmine Kara, singer and songwriter
 Arash Labaf, platinum-selling artist
 Lina Leandersson, actress
 Janet Leon, singer
 Lasse Lindroth, comedian and actor
 Reza Madadi, professional MMA fighter and convicted criminal.
 Jila Mossaed, poet, member of the Swedish Academy, Chair No. 15
 Babak Najafi, film director, screenwriter, and cinematographer
 Amin Nazari, professional football player
 Omid Nazari, professional football player* Bahar Pars, actress
 Shima Niavarani, actress
 Trita Parsi, founder and president of the National Iranian American Council
 Nahid Persson Sarvestani, film director
 Zinat Pirzadeh, comedian
 Laleh Pourkarim, singer-songwriter
 Arash Pournouri, music manager
 Daniel Rahimi, professional Ice hockey player
 Eddie Razaz, singer
 Farhad Saeidi, co-founder and President of COMSOL AB
 Behrang Safari, Swedish international footballer
 Ilya Salmanzadeh, music producer
 Nima Sanandaji, scientist and author
Ardalan Shekarabi, politician
 Maryam Yazdanfar, Riksdag politician
 Sara Zahedi, mathematician and winner of European Mathematical Society prize
 Nina Zanjani, actress 
 Mika Zibanejad, professional Ice hockey player

See also
Iran-Sweden relations
Iranian diaspora

References

External links
 
 Iranian-Swedish Community Classifieds Website in Persian (Farsi) Language

 
Muslim communities in Europe
Middle Eastern diaspora in Sweden
Iran–Sweden relations
Swedish Iranian